Mansur Zhumayev (born 13 May 1975) is a Uzbekistani judoka. He competed in the men's half-lightweight event at the 2000 Summer Olympics.

References

1975 births
Living people
Uzbekistani male judoka
Olympic judoka of Uzbekistan
Judoka at the 2000 Summer Olympics
Place of birth missing (living people)
Judoka at the 1998 Asian Games